Xiaonan District is a district of the city of Xiaogan, Hubei, People's Republic of China. It is under the administration of Xiaogan City.

Administrative divisions
Four subdistricts:
Shuyuan Subdistrict, Xinhua Subdistrict, Guangchang Subdistrict, Chezhan Subdistrict

Eight towns:
Xinpu, Xihe, Yangdian, Dougang, Xiaogang, Maochen, Sancha, Zhuzhan

Three townships:
Pengxing Township, Wolong Township, Minji Township

Six other areas:
Xiaonan Economic Development Area, Zhuhu Farm, Dongshantou Stock Station, Danyang Management Office, Xiaotian Management Office, Huaiyin Management Office

References 

County-level divisions of Hubei
Xiaogan